The Bubbleator was a large, bubble-shaped hydraulic elevator with transparent acrylic glass walls operated from an elevated chair built for the 1962 World's Fair in Seattle. These transparent walls gave the illusion of looking through an actual 'soap bubble' by refracting light to obtain a rainbow-like effect for the riders inside. It was originally part of the Washington State Coliseum (now a sports venue known as Climate Pledge Arena), where it lifted 100 passengers at a time up one floor through a structure of interlocking aluminum cubes to the "World of Tomorrow" exhibit. T. C. Howard of Synergetics, Inc. designed the Bubbleator and the exhibit.  After the fair, the Bubbleator was relocated to the Center House at Seattle Center. By 1984, it had been removed and put in storage to make way for the Seattle Children's Museum. It was sold to a private owner in Des Moines, Washington, who recycled the upper part of the dome into a greenhouse. The control chair, which had also been in private hands, was donated to the Museum of History and Industry in 2005.

While boarding the Bubbleator, passengers were commanded by an ethereal female voice to "Please move to the rear of the sphere", or the "Martian type" male elevator operator would say, "Step to the rear of the Sphere" in a creepy sci-fi type voice.

The soundtrack for the Bubbleator was conducted by Attilio Mineo and released as Man in Space with Sounds.

References

Century 21 Exposition
History of Seattle
Individual elevators
Seattle Center